Hrazdan is a town and urban municipal community in Armenia serving as the administrative centre of Kotayk Province, located  northeast of the capital Yerevan. As of the 2011 census, the population of the town is 41,875. It has lost a significant number of inhabitants since the 1989 census reported 59,000 people.

During the Soviet period, Hrazdan was one of the highly industrialized centres of the Armenian SSR.

The prelacy of the Diocese of Kotayk of the Armenian Apostolic Church is headquartered in Hrazdan.

Etymology 
The town is named after the Hrazdan River which flows through the town from north to south. The name Hrazdan itself is derived from the Middle-Persian name Frazdān which is related to the Zoroastrian mythology. Frazdān is the name of the lake mentioned in the Avesta while referring to Goshtasb's war with two of its enemies. Armenians were predominantly Zoroastrian before embracing Christianity, and Zoroastrian names were maintained in the geography of Armenia.

History

Ancient history and Middle Ages 

Historically, the territory of Hrazdan is associated with the historic Kotayk canton of Ayrarat province of Ancient Armenia.  According to Ptolemy, Kotayk was directly ruled by the Arsacid kings of Armenia during the 1st and 2nd centuries AD. Later between the 5th and 7th centuries, the region was granted to the Kamsarakan and Amatuni families, under the Persian rule. Between the 7th and 9th centuries, Armenia suffered from the Arab Islamic occupation.

By the end of the 9th century, the region became part of the newly established Bagratid Kingdom of Armenia. Between the 11th and 15th centuries, the region suffered from the Seljuk, Mongol, Ag Qoyunlu and Kara Koyunlu invasions, respectively.

16th to 19th centuries 
At the beginning of the 16th century, the territory became part of the Erivan Beglarbegi within the Safavid Persia. During the first half of the 18th century, the territory became part of the Erivan Khanate under the rule of the Afsharid dynasty and later under the Qajar dynasty of Persia. It remained under the Persian rule until 1827-1828, when Eastern Armenia was ceded to the Russian Empire as a result of the Russo-Persian War of 1826–28 and the signing of the Treaty of Turkmenchay.

20th century and beyond 
With the fall of the Russian Empire and as a result of the decisive Armenian victory over the Turks in the battles of Sardarabad, Abaran, and Gharakilisa, the region became part of the independent Armenia in May 1918. After 2 years of brief independence, Armenia became part of the Soviet Union in December 1920.

Hrazdan is among the towns that were founded and developed during the Soviet rule. The former village of Akhta (or Nerkin Akhta) -covering the southern parts of present-day Hrazdan- was the centre of the Akhta raion; an administrative territory of the Armenian SSR formed in 1930. In 1959, The village of Akhta was incorporated into an urban-type settlement known as Hrazdan. Akta raion was also renamed as Hrazdan raion.

The original urban development plan of Hrazdan was introduced in 1961-63 by architects M. Grigoryan and E. Altunyan. Upon the January 12, 1963 decision of the Supreme Soviet of the Armenian SSR on the territorial changes in the state, the villages of Vanatur, Jrarat, Kakavadzor and Makravan have been merged within Hrazdan to become a town of republican subordination. In fact, the town of Hrazdan was formed through the merger of a group of separate villages and settlements.

Hrazdan has gone through major development during the 1960s and 1970s when many large industrial plants were opened by the Soviet government, including the "HrazdanMash" machine tool plant, cement factory, Jrarat milk factory and the prefabricated concrete panels plant. Another urban development plan was introduced in 1978-80, where it was envisaged to accommodate 120,000 residents in Hrazdan by the end of 2010. However, the plan was eventually abandoned with the dissolution of the Soviet Union.

Modern-day Hrazdan is divided into 3 major parts: 
Northern, including the districts of Jrarat and Mikroshrjan, as well as the Hrazdan industrial district. 
Central, including the districts of Kochor, Vanatur, Kentron, and Makravan.
Southern, including the districts of Spandaryan and Aghbyurak along with the Hrazdan reservoir.

In December 1995, Hrazdan became the centre of the newly formed Kotayk Province.

Geography and climate 

The town of Hrazdan is located in the northeastern part of Armenia, within the Kotayk Province. It is bordered by the Pambak mountains range from the north and the Tsaghkunyats Mountains from the southwest. The borders of the town extended east across the Geghama mountains reaching up to the top of Mount Gutanasar. While passing through the town, Hrazdan River receives its tributaries; Marmarik and Aghveran rivers.

Hrazdan town has an average elevation 1675 meters above sea level. The town has a warm-summer humid continental climate (Köppen climate classification Dfb). The average temperature is 4,8 °C (-9 °C in January to 16,8 °C in August). The annual precipitation is between 715 and 730 mm.

Demographics

Religion 
The residents of Hrazdan are mainly Christians who belong to the Armenian Apostolic Church. The church is regulated by the Diocese of Kotayk.

Present-day Hrazdan is home to many churches dating back to the Middle Ages as well as the modern periods. The Surp Stepanos (Saint Stephen) Monastic Complex of Aghbyurak -currently in ruins- dates back to the 10th and 12th centuries. As of 2016, the town is home to the following churches:
 Makravank Monastery, consisted of 2 churches: the Holy Saviour's church of the 10th century and the Holy Mother of God church of the 13th century,
 Holy Cross Church of Kochor originally built in 1854-61, rebuilt in 2013,
 Holy Mother of God Church of Vanatur, opened in 1883,
 Blue Cross Chapel of Vanatur, built in 1993-96,
 Tukh Manuk Church, opened in 2003,
 Saint George's Church, opened in 2013.

Hrazdan is also home to many ruined churches and monasteries dating back to the medieval period, protected by the government of Armenia:
 Kakavadzor Upper Chapel, Hrazdan, 4-7th centuries,
 Surp Stepanos Church of Aghbyurak, 10-12th centuries, 
 Holy Right Monastery, 10-14th centuries,
 Kakavadzor Chapel, Hrazdan, 18-19th centuries
 Surp Karapet Church of Jrarat, 1831.

Culture 

The Hrazdan Drama Theatre was founded in 1953. The Hrazdan branch of the National Gallery of Armenia and the Geological Museum of Hrazdan are also among the prominent cultural institutions in the town. The History Museum in Hrazdan founded by Armen Aivazyan, features more than 4000 historical remnants and valuable pieces.

Media 
Hrazdan TV is a private TV company in Hrazdan, founded by the family of Harutyunyan. The family also publishes a private newspaper and runs a radio company named known as Hrazdan Radio. The number of the Hrazdan TV viewers is around 220,000. The TV is broadcasting its programmes since 1 September 1991, covering the Kotayk Province and some parts of the Gegharkunik Province.

Transportation 

Hrazdan is an important transport junction between the capital Yerevan and the northern provinces of Armenia. The M-4 Motorway that connects Yerevan with northern Armenia, passes through the southwestern edge of the town. As a provincial centre, Hrazdan is connected with the rest of Kotayk through a well-developed network of roads.

The town is also an important railroad station on the South Caucasus Railway (Yerevan to Shorzha and Yerevan to Dilijan lines).

Economy 
Hrazdan is one of the highly industrialized towns in Armenia. The town is home to many large plants including:
Hrazdan hydroelectric power plant: built between 1954 and 1959 in the Aghbyurak district of Hrazdan, as part of the Sevan–Hrazdan Cascade. It has two turbines with a total installed capacity of 81.6 MW. Its nominal annual generation is 375 GWh, but the factual generation for the last years has been about 40 GWh. The water reservoir has an area of 1.7 km² with a capacity of 5,6 million m³.

Hrazdan Thermal Power Plant (RazTES OJSC): is one of the largest thermal power plants in Transcaucasia. It was built in 1963–1974, and the first unit became operational in 1966. In 2013, a new unit was added. 4 older units of the plant are owned and operated by the Hrazdan Energy Company, a subsidiary of Inter RAO UES, while the new 5th unit is owned and operated by Gazprom Armenia. In 2015, Inter RAO UES sold the Hrazdan Energy Company to the Cyprus-registered Liormand Holdings Ltd., a part of the Tashir Group owned by Samvel Karapetyan. The plant has a total power of 1,110 MW (units 1-4) and 480 MW for the added 5th unit.
Hrazdan Cement factory of Hrazdan: founded in 1970 as "Hrazdan Cement Factory" by the Soviet government. It was privatized in 2001 to become owned by "MIKA Ltd.". In July 2014, a new group of owners took over the factory lead by Nikolay Khachaturov of Khachaturov Group. Since then, the plant has undergone major changes by improving the production technology and becoming more environmentally friendly. The plant is one of the largest cement producers in Transcaucasia with an annual production capacity of 1.2 million tons and the only one in the region with wet production methodology.
"Qualitech Machinery" machine tool plant is an Armenian-Canadian joint venture founded in 1999.

The town has also minor industrial firms including the "Hidro Storm" metal-plastic manufacturing plant founded in 2009, as well as the "Arjermek" and "Hakobyan" companies for building materials.

Education 
Hrazdan is home to the Humanitarian Institute of Hrazdan opened in 1996. Owned by the private sector, the university has 3 faculties: law, pedagogy and economics.

As of 2009, 13 public education schools, 13 nursery schools, 1 school for special needs and several musical and sport academies are operating in Hrazdan.

There is a research centre within the Hrazdan Zoological and Botanical Garden.

Sport 
Football is the most popular sport in Hrazdan. FC Shinarar was the football club who represented the town during the Soviet years. The municipal stadium of Hrazdan was their home venue. However, the club was dissolved in 1992 due to financial difficulties.

Field hockey is also popular in the town. Hrazdan is home to the only field hockey venue of Armenia, with a capacity of 1,500 seats. Hrazdan Hockey Club occasionally represents Armenia in several regional and international tournaments. The Soviet-Armenian player and 1980 Olympic bronze medalist Sos Hayrapetyan played for the club between 1988 and 1992.

Notable people born in Hrazdan 
Mishik Kazaryan (1948-2020), world-known Russian-Armenian physicist specialising in laser physics and optics, the winner of the State Prize of the USSR in the field of science and technology (1980), foreign member of the Armenian National Academy of Sciences, member of the A.M.Prokhorov Academy of Engineering Sciences, a creator of the sell-heating cooper vapor laser - the brightest repetitively pulsed laser in the visible region of the spectrum.
Armen Nazaryan (1982-), Armenian judoka

See also 
Hrazdan River

References

External links 

 Hrazdan city website
 Makravank Monastery
 Hrazdan TV

Populated places in Kotayk Province
Erivan Governorate